D61 may refer to :
 HMAS Swan (D61), a 1915 Royal Australian Navy River class torpedo boat destroyer
 HMS Calypso (D61), a 1917 British Royal Navy C class cruiser
 HMS Ilex (D61), a 1937 British Royal Navy I-class destroyer
 INS Delhi (D61), a 1995 Indian Navy Delhi class destroyer
 JNR Class D61, a Japanese steam locomotive converted from the JNR Class D51
 D61 motorway (Slovakia)
 SPS Churruca (D61), a 1972 Spanish Navy Gearing-class destroyer
Queen's Gambit Declined, Encyclopaedia of Chess Openings code
and also :
 the ICD-10 code for other aplastic anaemias